Villa De Madrid Indoor Meeting is an annual indoor track and field competition which takes place in February in Madrid, Spain. The event was first held at the Gallur Municipality Sport Complex in 2016 and is currently an World Athletics Indoor Tour meeting.

Meeting Records

Men

Women

References

External links
Official website
Meeting records

Athletics competitions in Spain
World Athletics Indoor Tour